The 1999 SWAC men's basketball tournament was held March 3–5, 1999. The quarterfinal round was held at the home arena of the higher-seeded team, while the semifinal and championship rounds were held at the F. G. Clark Activity Center in Baton Rouge, Louisiana.  defeated , 89–83 in the championship game. The Braves received the conference's automatic bid to the 1999 NCAA tournament as No. 15 seed in the West Region.

Bracket and results

References

1998–99 Southwestern Athletic Conference men's basketball season
SWAC men's basketball tournament